Domlyan Bay (‘Zaliv Domlyan’ \'za-liv 'dom-lyan\) is the 4.75 km wide bay indenting for 5.5 km Oscar II Coast in Graham Land south of Radovene Point and north of Kalina Point.  It is part of Exasperation Inlet, formed as a result of the break-up of Larsen Ice Shelf in the area, and the retreat of Melville Glacier in the early 21st century.  The feature is named after the settlement of Domlyan in Southern Bulgaria.

Location
SCAR Antarctic Digital Database mapping in 2012.

Maps
Antarctic Digital Database (ADD). Scale 1:250000 topographic map of Antarctica. Scientific Committee on Antarctic Research (SCAR). Since 1993, regularly upgraded and updated.

References
 Domlyan Bay. SCAR Composite Antarctic Gazetteer.
 Bulgarian Antarctic Gazetteer. Antarctic Place-names Commission. (details in Bulgarian, basic data in English)

External links
 Domlyan Bay. Copernix satellite image

Bays of Graham Land
Oscar II Coast
Bulgaria and the Antarctic